Edward Gerhard Kuster (August 15, 1878 – September 1961) was a musician and attorney from Los Angeles for twenty-one years before coming to Carmel-by-the-Sea, California in 1921. He became involved in theater and establish his own theatre and school. He built the Theatre of the Golden Bough in 1924, and a second theater, the Golden Bough Playhouse in 1952. Kuster directed 85 plays and acted in more than 50 roles in the 35 years he lived in Carmel.

Early life

Edward G. Kuster was born on August 15, 1878, in Terre Haute, Indiana. He was the son of Charles Edward Kuster (1842-1915), a Los Angeles physician, and Emma Eshman. Kuster came to Los Angeles, California in July 1886, as a student in public schools for three years. He went to Germany with his parents, where he attended the Hoehere Burger school in Berlin until 1892. He returned to Los Angeles and finished high school in 1896. He went to the University of Southern California (USC) and graduated in 1900 with a degree of Bachelor of Laws.

Kuster married Una Lindsay Call on May 31, 1902, in San Andreas, California by P H. Kean. In the fall of 1905, Una met Robinson Jeffers, when they both attended classes at USC. Una earned her Bachelor of Arts in 1908 and her Master's in philosophy in 1910. Jeffers was in medical school. Jeffers and Una Kuster became romantically involved. Kuster discovered their affair in 1910. By 1912 the affair became a public scandal, reaching the front page of the Los Angeles Times. Una spent some time in Europe to quiet things down. Una and Jeffers lived together by Lake Washington, near Seattle until Una's divorced in 1913. Jeffers studied forestry in Seattle. They were married in 1913, and moved to La Jolla, California, and then to Carmel, California, near where Jeffers constructed Tor House and Hawk Tower.

Career

Attorney

Kuster passed the California Bar Examination on March 13, 1902, and then entered the law office of Graves, O'Helveny & Shankland and worked there until 1903. He became the chief clerk for attorney H. W. O'Melveny until 1906. He practiced law for himself in Los Angeles specializing in railroad rate cases, e.g. the Switching Case that was heard before the Interstate Commerce Commission in 1908.

Kuster joined Joseph P. Loeb in the practice of law, and in 1908, they, along with brother Leon Loeb, formed the law firm of Kuster, Loeb & Loeb. In May 1911, Edward Kuster left the law office.

Kuster married Edith June Emmons on August 1, 1913, in Bakersfield, California. They lived in San Gabriel, California in 1913. They separated in 1918, and were divorced on March 30, 1920, in San Diego, California.

Edward Kuster House

Kuster married Ruth E. McDowell in 1920. Inspired by castles from his trip to Germany, he and his wife designed and built the house in 1920, with the help of contractor Lee E. Gottfried, a small Medieval European-style stone castle at 26205 Ocean View Avenue off of Scenic Drive on Carmel Point. Like Tor House, it was made of granite stones brought up from the Carmel beach. The roof is done with Vermont slate. The Jeffers and Kusters became great friends.

Kuster was an early member of Carmel's Abalone League, along Frederick R. Bechdolt, Charley Van Riper, James Hopper, John Hillaiard, Ernest Schweninger, Talbert Josselyn, R. C. Smith, and Winsor Josselyn.

Theater

Kuster took small parts at Los Angele's Majestic Theater in his spare time. He also played cello in the Los Angeles Symphony and became a stage manager lighting expert at the Denishawn school founded in 1915 by dancers Ruth St. Denis and her husband Ted Shawn in Los Angeles. Kuster was legal adviser and fried with St. Denis.

Arts and Crafts Theater

Kuster, 41 years old, and his wife came to Carmel in 1921, because of the number of theatre directors and actors and the need for an acting school. He became involved with the Arts and Crafts Theater with Perry Newberry on Casanova Street and the Forest Theater on Santa Rita Street & Mountain View Avenue. In 1921, Kuster composed and orchestrated the music for the Irish play, The Countess Cathleen, with Herbert Heron as the director, at the Forest Theater.

After the success of the play, the board of the Forest Theater Society elected him president of the board. In July 1922, he was asked to direct the play Caesar and Cleopatra. His wife Ruth played Cleopatra. The stage had a large sphinx designed by artist Jo Mora.

Other plays put on by the Arts and Crafts Theater were Cinderella, Doubling in Brass, Captain Brassbound's Conversion, Children Of The Moon, Clarence, In His Arms, One Of The Family, and What Happened to Jones.

First Golden Bough Theatre

In 1923, Kuster decided to design and build his own indoor theatre and hired Leo Gottfried to build it. He called the Theatre of the Golden Bough, with the Court of the Golden Bough in front. It was located on the south side of Ocean Avenue between Lincoln Street and Monte Verde Street. The doors opened on June 3, 1924. This "Golden Bough," opened at almost the time as the Arts and Crafts Theater, on Monte Verde Street between Eighth and Ninth Avenue, the first two indoor theatres in Carmel's history.

Kuster had Gottfried build the Carmel Weavers Studio for his wife Ruth in September 1922 (now Cottage of Sweets). The studio was in front of the theatre. It housed Ruth and two fellow local weavers. They made and sold woven scarves, hats, handbags, blankets, and other clothing articles. In July 1923, the studio was rolled down on logs from Dolores Street to the Court of the Golden Bough on Ocean Avenue. In August 1923, Gottfried expanded the studio with a design by Kuster that included a brick fireplace and a ticket booth for the theatre. At the same time, construction of Kuster's Seven Arts Shop was being planned as another shop for the courtyard. Kuster would have Gottfried build Sade's on the northeast side of the court in 1925. Kuster also designed and had Michael J. Murphy build the Seven Arts Shop in the Tudor Storybook style in 1923 next to the Golden Bough theater.

In  the 1920s, the Golden Bough theatre became famous with Maurice Browne and wife Ellen Van Volkenburg as directors of its acting school. The instructor of dance was Ruth Ford, one of the original dancers of the Denishawn Dancers, and wife of Byington Ford. New York drama critic and film producer Kenneth Macgowan characterized Carmel as an "artists colony where nine plays were in reheresal in one July and where the population appears to include 2,000 actors and no audience."

The first productions at the Golden Bough were Philip Barry's You and I, Beyond the Horizon, Henrik Ibsen's The Master Builder, and St. John Greer Ervine's The Ship. In 1926, Kuster obtained the first U.S. rights to The Threepenny Opera based on The Beggar's Opera, an eighteenth-century ballad opera by John Gay, seven years before it opened on Broadway at the Empire Theatre, on April 13, 1933. He was criticized, when he put on the plays They Knew What They Wanted and Beggar on Horseback.

In 1927, Kuster traveled to Europe for one year to study theater production techniques in Berlin and Munich, where he learned about the foreign theater and to negotiate for rights to produce English and European plays in the United States. He married Gabrielle "Gay" Young-Hunter, daughter of Mary Young Hunter, in Germany in 1928.

During Great Depression in the United States Kuster had to lease the Theatre of the Golden Bough on Ocean Avenue to a movie theater chain for a period of five years. Kuster stipulated that the name "Golden Bough" could not be used for a movie house so it was renamed the Carmel Theatre.

In 1929, after returning from a European trip, Kuster was approached by the Abalone League, who offered to sell Kuster its entire theatre operation, including both the struggling Arts and Crafts Theater on Monte Verde and the Carmel Arts and Crafts Club on Casanova Street. Kuster accepted the offer. He remodeled the theatre facility and renamed it the Studio Theatre of the Golden Bough. Kuster then moved all his activities, plays concerts, traveling theatre groups, lectures to the renamed Arts and Crafts Theater, "Studio Theatre," on Monte Verde Street.

In 1935, Kuster renegotiated his lease with the movie tenants of the Theatre of the Golden Bough (on Ocean Ave.), to perform a stage play one weekend each month. On May 17, 1935, Kuster opened his adaptation of By Candlelight, a comedy play he had done several times before. Two nights later, on May 19, the original Theatre of the Golden Bough on Ocean Avenue was destroyed by fire. Arson was the suspected cause of the blaze.

Today, the Court of the Golden Bough flagstone courtyard still exits that once sourrounded the Golden Bough Theater's wood door entrance. Only the building facade emains. The entrance now opens to an arcade courtyard with shops behind a restaurant that was once known as Sade's. 

Kuster, who had previously bought out the Carmel Arts and Crafts Theatre, moved his film operation to this facility on Monte Verde Street, renamed it the Filmarte Group and it became the first "art house" between Los Angeles and San Francisco.

Golden Bough Theater (S.F.)

After the fire, Kuster left Carmel and opened a 200-seat Golden Bough Playhouse on Sutter Street in San Francisco. He had been there before from 1932 to 1934, where he produced plays at the San Francisco School of Theater. In 1938, Theatre labor union problems forced him to give up the project. Later that year he was invited to Hollywood for two years as the personal assistant to Max Reinhardt. While there, he taught classes and directed English and American plays in Reinhardt's Theatre Workshop.

He and his wife, Gabriell Kuster, were in the cast.

Second Golden Bough Theatre

In 1940, Kuster returned to Carmel and to the Filmarte, the old Carmel Arts and Crafts Theatre on Monte Verde Street, whose lease had expired, renamed it the Golden Bough Playhouse and again put on plays, foreign films, and movies. For two summers, 1940 and 1941, he directed the Golden Bough School of Theatre.

On May 16, 1949, Kuster decided to revive his 1935 production of the play By Candlelight. It got rave reviews from critics. However, on May 21, 1949, this second "Golden Bough" also burned to the ground. Once again, arson was suspected. The By Candlelight continued at the Sunset School Auditorium from May 23 to May 30.

Third Golden Bough Theatre
Kuster considered rebuilding two theatres, the playhouse at the Monte Verde location, and a movie theatre at the site of the original Golden Bough on Ocean Avenue. Ultimately, he built a two-theater facility on the destroyed Monte Verde site. For the third time, the Golden Bough was built, this time as a corporation. The main auditorium, called the Golden Bough, faced Monte Verde Street. With 330 seats and a stage. A 150-seat theater in the round, called the Circle Theatre, faced Casanova Street. The new Golden Bough opened its doors on October 2, 1952, with a Monterey Symphony Orchestra concert.

On May 18, 1956, Kuster, after thirty-five years of acting and directing, appeared as Grandpere in play The Happy Time. Since 1994, the facility has been owned and operated by Pacific Repertory Theatre, Monterey County's only year-round professional theatre company.

Death
Kuster reminisced in a talk given at the Carmel Women's Club on May 31, 1960. It was his last public appearance before departing on a trip to Europe with His wife, Gabrielle Kuster. He died, at age 83, in the 2nd week of September 1961 in Lugano, Ticino, Switzerland, when traveling in Europe he took ill. He was buried in Lugano. His wife Gabriel, returned to Carmel Valley, California. She died in August 1978.

See also
 List of Historic Homes in Carmel Point

References

External links

Pacific Repertory Theatre

1878 births
1961 deaths
20th-century American lawyers
People from Carmel-by-the-Sea, California
Lawyers from Los Angeles